Raid Laban College, established in 1984, is a general degree college situated in Shillong, Meghalaya. This college is affiliated with the North Eastern Hill University.

Departments

Science
Physics
Mathematics
Chemistry
Computer Science
Environment
Botany
Zoology
Psychology

Arts and Commerce
Khasi
Mizo
Nepali
English
Hindi
History
Geography
Education
Economics
Philosophy
Sociology
Political Science
Commerce
Management

References

External links
http://www.raidlabancollege.org

Universities and colleges in Meghalaya
Colleges affiliated to North-Eastern Hill University
Educational institutions established in 1984
1984 establishments in Meghalaya